The women's marathon at the 2022 Commonwealth Games, as part of the athletics programme, was held in Victoria Square, Birmingham on 30 July 2022.

Records
Prior to this competition, the existing world and Games records were as follows:

Schedule
The schedule was as follows:

All times are British Summer Time (UTC+1)

Results
The results were as follows:

References

Women's marathon
2022
2022 in women's athletics
Comm
2022 Commonwealth Games